Badland (stylized BADLAND) is a mobile video game developed by Finland-based Frogmind Games and first released on the iOS and Android platforms in 2013. It was released on Windows Phone 8 in June 2014. There is also a Game of the Year Edition that was released in May 2015 for PlayStation 3, PlayStation 4, PlayStation Vita, Xbox One, Wii U and Steam for Linux, Microsoft Windows and OS X, and in August 2021 for Nintendo Switch. In December 2015, its sequel Badland 2 was released on iOS and Android. For the same platforms, a real-time strategy spin-off, Badland Brawl, was released in September 2018, where gameplay is a mash-up between Angry Birds and Clash Royale.

Gameplay

The player flies around a little black creature called a Clone through the woods of the game. Beginning in Day I, the game progresses through four stages which consist of Dawn, Noon, Dusk, and Night, each with a separate color scheme and new theme of traps. As the player goes through Day I, egg-shaped machines begin to come out of the water of the background. Heading into the night, the machines begin to turn on and the game becomes harder as the machines become part of the dangers of the forest. Eventually, the character succeeds in disabling the machines and the machines become dormant once again until Day II begins it all over. Most of Day II is similar in plot structure, but smaller octopus-like machines begin to make themselves known and the animals in the forest begin to disappear. The last level includes saving a rabbit that was hanging by its foot and eventually coming to fly in front of a giant eye of one of the machines, leaving a cliffhanger into possible future updates. 
Also included in the game are possible in-app purchases that continue the story with some of Clony's friends, including ones nicknamed Snorf and Fury, featured in their own level packs. In early 2014, level pack Doomsday was released, featuring Fury and his escape from the machine infested woods. Also included is the Daydream level pack in which Snorf escapes, finding the magic of the forest makes the woods not all as it seems to be. In 2015 a new multiplayer feature was released which allowed up to 4 players to play at the same time.

Level World 
Another new feature, "Level World" was introduced, in which players could make their own levels and release it in the "Level World" for other players to explore.

Reception 

The game won Apple Inc.'s 2013 iPad Game of the Year award. It also won the Grand Prix award in the 10th annual International Mobile Gaming Awards. The game has a Metacritic score of 85/100 based on 20 critic reviews.

References

External links 
Badland official website
Badland reviewed on Android Apps Zone
Badland Online Web Version

2013 video games
Android (operating system) games
BlackBerry 10 games
IOS games
Linux games
MacOS games
Monochrome video games
PlayStation 3 games
PlayStation 4 games
PlayStation Network games
PlayStation Vita games
Video games developed in Finland
Windows games
Windows Phone games
Wii U games
Wii U eShop games
Xbox One games
Video games with silhouette graphics
Multiplayer and single-player video games
QubicGames games